Mainstream 1958: The East Coast Jazz Scene is a 1958 album by jazz musicians Wilbur Harden and John Coltrane. It is the first of three collaborative albums with Harden and Coltrane as leaders, the other two being Jazz Way Out and Tanganyika Strut. The session produced several alternate takes; all of them can be found on the compilations featuring the complete Savoy recordings made by Harden and Coltrane together, The Complete Mainstream 1958 Sessions (2009) and The Complete Savoy Sessions (1999).

Track listing
 "Wells Fargo" — 7:26
 "West 42nd St." — 7:51
 "E.F.F.P.H" — 5:26
 "Snuffy" — 9:37
 "Rhodomagnetics" — 7:11

Personnel
 Wilbur Harden — flugelhorn
 John Coltrane — tenor saxophone
 Tommy Flanagan — piano
 Doug Watkins — bass
 Louis Hayes — drums

Literature
 Richard Cook & Brian Morton. The Penguin Guide to Jazz on CD 6th edition.

References 

1958 albums
Wilbur Harden albums
Savoy Records albums